In enzymology, a hydroxycyclohexanecarboxylate dehydrogenase is an enzyme that catalyzes the chemical reaction

(1S,3R,4S)-3,4-dihydroxycyclohexane-1-carboxylate + NAD+  (1S,4S)-4-hydroxy-3-oxocyclohexane-1-carboxylate + NADH + H+

Thus, the two substrates of this enzyme are (1S,3R,4S)-3,4-dihydroxycyclohexane-1-carboxylate and NAD+, whereas its 3 products are (1S,4S)-4-hydroxy-3-oxocyclohexane-1-carboxylate, NADH, and H+.

This enzyme belongs to the family of oxidoreductases, specifically those acting on the CH-OH group of donor with NAD+ or NADP+ as acceptor. The systematic name of this enzyme class is (1S,3R,4S)-3,4-dihydroxycyclohexane-1-carboxylate:NAD+ 3-oxidoreductase. Other names in common use include dihydroxycyclohexanecarboxylate dehydrogenase, and (−)t-3,t-4-dihydroxycyclohexane-c-1-carboxylate-NAD+ oxidoreductase.

References

 

EC 1.1.1
NADH-dependent enzymes
Enzymes of unknown structure